Sylvester Marion and Frances Anne Stephens Baker House is a historic home located near Montgomery City, Montgomery County, Missouri.  It was built in 1854, and is two-story, Greek Revival style brick I-house.  It features a one-story portico, formal entryway with open staircase, and an elaborate door surround.

It was listed on the National Register of Historic Places in 1999.

References

Houses on the National Register of Historic Places in Missouri
Greek Revival houses in Missouri
Houses completed in 1854
Buildings and structures in Montgomery County, Missouri
National Register of Historic Places in Montgomery County, Missouri